3 for Tonight is a musical revue in two acts with music by composer Walter Schumann and lyrics by Robert Wells. In addition to the original material by Schumann and Wells, the revue also included the song "In That Great Gettin' Up Mornin" by Jester Hairston and two songs by Jack Norworth, "By the Light of the Silvery Moon" and "Shine on, Harvest Moon". The musical opened on Broadway on April 6, 1955, at the Plymouth Theatre where it closed after 85 performances on June 18, 1955. On June 22, 1955, the cast performed the musical live on television for national broadcast on CBS. Produced by Paul Gregory, the production was staged by Gower Champion who also starred in the musical with his wife Marge Champion, Harry Belafonte, Betty Benson, and Hiram Sherman. The show won the Outer Critics Circle Award for Best Musical in 1955.

References

External links
3 For Tonight at IBDB

1955 musicals
Broadway musicals